The 1993 Ball State Cardinals football team was an American football team that represented Ball State University in the Mid-American Conference (MAC) during the 1993 NCAA Division I-A football season. In its ninth season under head coach Paul Schudel, the team compiled an 8–3–1 record (7–0–1 against conference opponents), won the MAC championship, and lost to Utah State in the 1993 Las Vegas Bowl. The team played its home games at Ball State Stadium in Muncie, Indiana.

The team's statistical leaders included Mike Neu with 2,148 passing yards, Tony Nibbs with 777 rushing yards, Brian Oliver with 1,010 receiving yards, and Brian Oliver and Michael Blair each with 60 points scored.

Schedule

References

Ball State
Ball State Cardinals football seasons
Mid-American Conference football champion seasons
Ball State Cardinals football